Gözde Yılmaz (born 9 September 1991 in Ankara) is a Turkish volleyball player. Currently, she plays for Eczacıbaşı VitrA. Yılmaz is a member of the Turkey women's national volleyball team.

Career

Clubs
A member of Eczacıbaşı VitrA, she was loaned out to Sarıyer Belediyesi in the 2013–14 season.

National team
She was called up to the Turkey women's national volleyball team, and played as team captain at the 2014 Women's European Volleyball League that won the gold medal.

Clubs
 TED Ankara Kolejliler Volleyball (2000–2007)
 Eczacıbaşı VitrA (2007–2009)
 Yeşilyurt Istanbul (2009–2010)
 Eczacıbaşı VitrA (2010–2013)
 Sarıyer Belediyespor (2013–2014)
 Eczacıbaşı VitrA (2014–2015)
 Futura Volley Busto Arsizio (2015–2016)
 Eczacıbaşı VitrA (2021-)

Awards

National team
2014 Women's European Volleyball League -  champion

See also
 Turkish women in sports

References

External links
 Gözde Yılmaz at Scoresway 
 

1991 births
Turkish women's volleyball players
Eczacıbaşı volleyball players
Sarıyer Belediyesi volleyballers
Living people
European Games gold medalists for Turkey
European Games medalists in volleyball
Volleyball players at the 2015 European Games
Turkey women's international volleyball players
Yeşilyurt volleyballers